Stijn, Baron Coninx (born 21 February 1957) is a Belgian film director.

Career 
He studied film directing at HRITCS (currently Ritcs, at Erasmus Hogeschool Brussel). Baron Coninx is best known for his film Daens, which was nominated for an Academy Award for Best Foreign Language Film in 1992. He was made a Baron by Baudouin.

Honours 
 1993 : Created Baron Coninx by King Baudouin
 member of the Royal Flemish Academy of Belgium for Science and the Arts.

Filmography

Director
 Servais (1980), his university finals film.
 Surfing (1982), short film.
 Hector (1987)
 Koko Flanel (1990)
 Daens (1992) (nominated for an Academy Award)
 When the Light Comes (Licht) (1998)
 Further Than the Moon (Verder dan de maan) (2003)
 To Walk Again (2007), documentary
 Sister Smile (2009)
 Marina (2013)
 Ay Ramon! (2015)
 Niet Schieten (2018)

Assistant director
 Het Beest (1982)
 Zaman (1983) (credited as Stijn Coninckx)
 Wildschut (1985) (Stronghold in the United States)
 De Leeuw van Vlaanderen (1985)
 Skin (1987)
 Blueberry Hill (1989)

Television work
 Het Peulengaleis (1999) TV series
 Nefast voor de feestvreugde'' (2001, 2002, 2003) TV series

References

External links
 
 Stijn Coninx – Film information from the Belgium government site belgium.be

People from Neerpelt
Barons of Belgium
Belgian film directors
1957 births
Living people
Members of the Royal Flemish Academy of Belgium for Science and the Arts